The 1988 United States Senate election in Arizona took place on November 8, 1988. Incumbent Democratic U.S. Senator Dennis DeConcini was reelected to a third term. This would be the last victory by a Democrat in a Senate race in Arizona until Kyrsten Sinema's victory in the 2018 election thirty years later, and remains the last time that a Democrat has been elected to and served a full term in this seat.

Major candidates

Democratic 
 Dennis DeConcini, Incumbent U.S. Senator

Republican 
 Keith DeGreen, Marine veteran and financial advisor

Results

See also 
 1988 United States Senate elections
 1988 United States presidential election in Arizona

References 

1988
Arizona
1988 Arizona elections